Blessed Madness is a 2018 Italian comedy film directed by Carlo Verdone.

Plot
Guglielmo and Lidia have been married for twenty-five years; on the day of their anniversary, Lidia confesses to her husband that she has been cheating on him for a year with Guglielmo's order. Having lost his wife and sales assistant, the man offers the job to Luna, a Roman girl with money problems. After a troubled start, Guglielmo and Luna manage to enter into symbiosis, both at work and in private life, to the point that she helps him find a new partner.

Cast

References

External links

2018 films
Films directed by Carlo Verdone
2010s Italian-language films
2018 comedy films
Italian comedy films
2010s Italian films